Twinemen is an alternative rock band based in Cambridge, Massachusetts, USA created by former members of the bands Morphine and Face to Face. The group includes Dana Colley (saxophone / vocals), Billy Conway (percussion / vocals / sometimes acoustic guitar), and Laurie Sargent (lead singer / lead guitar). Various bass players, including former Face to Face guitarist Stuart Kimball, also perform with the band on the road and in the studio. Twinemen's music includes a mix of jazz, blues, acid rock, and lounge.

Twinemen chose their name as an homage to Morphine's late leader Mark Sandman and his The Twinemen comic series. The Twinemen depicted three anthropomorphic balls of twine who play together in a band. Twinemen currently records in their Cambridge-based Hi-n-Dry Studios.

Discography

Studio albums
 Twinemen (July 9, 2002)
 Sideshow (September 21, 2004)
 Twinetime (August 21, 2007)

Live albums
All live albums released through the Kufala Recordings label.
 Madison, Wisconsin 02/01/2003
 Chicago, Illinois 02/02/2003
 Cambridge, Massachusetts 10/23/2003
 Denver, Colorado 09/25/2003
 San Francisco, California 10/01/2003
 Los Angeles, California 10/02/2003

External links 
 Twinemen on Myspace
 Twinemen at Hi-N-Dry archive

Musical groups from Massachusetts
Alternative rock groups from Massachusetts